Bruno Michaud (14 October 1935 — 1 November 1997) was a Swiss footballer and manager who played as a defender mainly for FC Basel and the Swiss national football team.

Club career
Michaud started his football in the youth teams of Basel. He was brought up to the first team as Béla Sárosi was coach.  He transferred for one and a half years to FC Lausanne-Sport, but returned for the second half of the 1959–60 season after Jenő Vincze became Basel's new coach. He played for Basel for thirteen seasons and won the Swiss Cup twice and the championship three times under coaches Georges Sobotka and Helmut Benthaus.

Michaud's first Cup win was in 1962–63 and the first championship title was achieved in Basel's 1966–67 season. In that same season Michaud also won the double with Basel. In the Cup final in the former Wankdorf Stadium on 15 May 1967 Basel's opponents were Lausanne-Sports. Helmut Hauser scored the decisive goal via penalty. The game went down in football history due to the sit-down strike that followed that penalty goal. With the score at 1–1 after 88 minutes play, referee Karl Göppel awarded Basel a controversial penalty. André Grobéty had pushed Hauser gently in the back and Hauser let himself drop theatrically. After the 2–1 lead for Basel the Lausanne players subsequently refused to resume the game and they sat down demonstratively on the pitch. The referee was forced to abandon the match. Basel were awarded the cup with a 3–0 forfait.

During his time with Basel Michaud played a total of 355 competitive games and scored 22 goals, including Championship and Cup as well as European Cup, European Cup Winners' Cup and Fairs Cup. He retired from his playing career after the 1969–70 season after winning his third championship. He stayed with the club and became technical director for the period that Benthaus remained trainer.

International playing career
Michaud was called up by trainers Alfredo Foni and Erwin Ballabio into the Switzerland national football team. He played fifteen times for the Swiss national football team. He played his debut for Switzerland on 24 May 1967 in the Hardturm, in Zürich, in front of 21,337 spectators in the legendary 7–1 win against Romania. Michaud played his last game for his country on 15 October 1969 in Thessaloniki under coach Erwin Ballabio. The 1970 FIFA World Cup qualification game for UEFA Group 1 ended with a 1–4 defeat against Greece.

International coaching career
Following his playing career Michaud acted as assistant to trainer Louis Maurer of the Swiss national team. After Maurers early retirement as manager, in November 1970, Michaud took over as manager. He was team manager from April 1972 to May 1973.

His first game as coach was on 26 April 1972 in a friendly match against Sweden which ended in a 1–1 draw. His final game in charge was on 9 May 1973 as Switzerland played a 0–0 draw against Turkey. Michaud's balance as seven times nation team trainer was one win, five draws and one defeat, four goals for, but seven against. René Hüssy followed Michaud as national team coach. Michaud stayed with the national team, he was delegation leader of the Swiss national team and later senior member in the Committee of the National League (Responsible for game scheduling).

Curiosity
A well-documented curiosity was the fact that during the winter break of their 1963–64 season the team travelled on a world tour. This saw them visit British Hong Kong, Malaysia, Singapore, Australia, New Zealand, French Polynesia, Mexico and the United States. First team manager Jiří Sobotka together with 16 players and 15 members of staff, supporters and journalists participated in this world tour from 10 January to 10 February 1964. Team captain Michaud filmed the events with his super-8 camara. The voyage around the world included 19 flights and numerous bus and train journeys. Club chairman, Lucien Schmidlin, led the group, but as they arrived in the hotel in Bangkok, he realised that 250,000 Swiss Francs were missing. The suitcase that he had filled with the various currencies was not with them. He had left it at home, but fortunately Swiss Air were able to deliver this to him within just a few days. 

During the tour a total of ten friendly/test games were played, these are listed in their 1963–64 season. Five wins, three draws, two defeats, but also three major injuries resulted from these test matches. A broken leg for Peter Füri, an eye injury for Walter Baumann and a knee injury for Michaud himself soon reduced the number of players to just 13. Michaud played in the first five of these games.

Honours
Basel
 Swiss League champions: 1966–67, 1968–69, 1969–70
 Swiss Cup winner: 1962–63, 1966–67
 Swiss Cup runner-up: 1969–70
 Coppa delle Alpi winner: 1969
 Uhren Cup winner: 1969

References

Notes

Sources
 Rotblau: Jahrbuch Saison 2015/2016. Publisher: FC Basel Marketing AG. 
 Beat Jung (Hg.): Die Nati. Die Geschichte der Schweizer Fussball-Nationalmannschaft. Verlag Die Werkstatt, Göttingen 2006, 
 A list of Swiss Cup Finals at RSSSF

External links

FC Basel players
FC Lausanne-Sport players
Swiss men's footballers
Switzerland international footballers
Switzerland national football team managers
1935 births
1997 deaths
Association football defenders
Swiss football managers